Willmore Wilderness Park, located in Alberta, Canada, is a  wilderness area adjacent to Jasper National Park. It is lesser known and less visited than Jasper National Park. There are no public roads, bridges or buildings. There are, however, several ranger cabins in the park that are available as a courtesy to visitors.

Other parks surround this wilderness reserve: Kakwa Wildlands Park to the north, Kakwa Provincial Park and Protected Area to the west, Rock Lake Provincial Park to the south-west, Sulphur Gates Provincial Recreation Area to the east.  Kakwa Wildlands Park, Kakwa Provincial Park and Willmore Wilderness Park comprise the first interprovincial park shared between Alberta and British Columbia.

Access to the park is via Highway 40, through the hamlet of Grande Cache, and the four staging areas: Sulphur Gates, Cowlick Creek, Berland River and Rock Lake. Motorized vehicles are not allowed in the park; transportation is done by foot, horse, mountain bike or ski.

Another staging area is found south-east of the park, in the town of Hinton.

History 
In terms of local governance, those lands within Willmore Wilderness Park were split between the Improvement District (ID) No. 14 and ID No. 16 prior to 1994. Those lands within Willmore Wilderness Park were incorporated as ID No. 25 on January 2, 1994. The park was named on April 12, 1965 after Norman Willmore of Edson, a provincial cabinet minister and member of the Legislative Assembly of Alberta who was killed in a motor vehicle accident in February 1965. It was previously known as Wilderness Provincial Park, established in 1959 through a bill introduced by Willmore.

Conservation 
Willmore Wilderness Park is managed by Alberta Community Development as a wilderness park. Conservation-based research within the park includes:
 Willmore Biodiversity Monitoring Project
 Alberta Experimental Wolverine Monitoring Project

The park protects a large population of mountain goats and bighorn sheep (20% of the total population in Alberta). Other mammals commonly found here include grizzly bears, woodland caribou, elk, deer, cougars and timber wolves. Coyotes, wolverines, lynx and black bears are also present in the sub-alpine region, while marmots, rock pika, ptarmigan and Rocky Mountain goats can be found in the higher alpine areas.

The sub-alpine environment contains white spruce, lodgepole pine, balsam fir and aspen poplar.

Several First Nations burial sites are located at Big Grave Flats, as well as some early coal mining, forestry and trapper cabins.

Activities
Recreational activities in the park include camping, hiking, horseback riding, mountain biking, cross-country skiing and some hunting. Fishing for bull trout is allowed only in a catch-and-release fashion ( bull trout have been caught on the upper part of the Jackpine River). Canoeing and whitewater rafting can be done on the Smoky River.

Motorized vehicles are prohibited within the park.

Open pit fires are allowed.

Potential dangers while travelling through the park are changing weather (which can make rising waters dangerous to ford), lost and water-logged trails and the abundant bear population.

Several trails cross the park (Indian Trail, Pope Thoreau Trail, Great Divide Trail), and horseback riding can be done along rivers and passes (Sulphur River, West Sulphur River, Rocky Pass, Jackknife Pass, Casket Pass, Forget-Me-Not Pass, Fetherstonhaugh Pass and Morkill Pass).

Rock Lake staging area allows easy access to north of Jasper park through Willow Creek trail. The 14 km trail joins the north boundary trail at about 49 km (from snake Indian River staging).

See also
List of protected areas of Alberta
List of provincial parks in Alberta
List of National Parks of Canada
Cypress Hills Interprovincial Park (Alberta-Saskatchewan)

References

External links
 Photographs of Willmore Wilderness Park
 Willmore Wilderness Foundation

Parks in Alberta
Parks in the Canadian Rockies